SBS6 is a Dutch free-to-cable commercial TV channel and is a part of Talpa TV, formerly known as SBS Broadcasting B.V. and now owned by Talpa Network. Other channels of the group in the Netherlands are Net5, Veronica, and SBS9.

History
SBS stands for Scandinavian Broadcasting System. When the SBS Broadcasting Group started expanding outside of Scandinavia in 1995, one of the first countries where they set up a channel was the Netherlands with SBS6. SBS6 was the third Dutch commercial TV station after RTL 4 and RTL 5, both being launched in 1989 and 1993 respectively. SBS6 launched on 28 August 1995.

When SBS6 was launched, they were in a tough competition with the channel Veronica, which started as a commercial station at the same time. Both SBS6 and Veronica wanted to be on channel 6 of the viewer's television.

The SBS Broadcasting Group expanded their Dutch channel lineup with Net5 on 1 March 1999. In 2003, Veronica was added to the lineup.

The German ProSiebenSat.1 Media took over the parent company, SBS Broadcasting Group, on 27 June 2007. In 2011, all of SBS's activities in the Netherlands (through SBS Broadcasting B.V.), including the three TV stations (SBS6, Net5, and Veronica), the two TV guides (Veronica Magazine and Totaal TV), production, design, and teletext activities were sold to a joint venture between Sanoma Media Netherlands (67%) and Talpa Holding (33%).

On 10 April 2017, Talpa Holding acquired a 67% stake from Sanoma Media Netherlands.

Programming

Imported
According to Jim
Castle
Close to Home
Columbo
Coronation Street
Diagnosis: Murder
Flashpoint
Friends
Heartbeat
House
Little House on the Prairie
Martin
Medical Emergency
Monk
My Wife and Kids
NCIS
NCIS: Los Angeles
Space: Above and Beyond
The Fresh Prince of Bel-Air
The Mentalist
The Sing-Off
Under the Dome
Who's the Boss?

Local
BankGiro Loterij The Wall
Bouw Je Droom
Celblok H (an adaptation of the Australian drama Wentworth)
Domino Day
Hart van Nederland
Postcodeloterij Miljoenenjacht

Reportage
Shownieuws
Trauma Centrum

Sports
 BDO World Darts Championship
 Marathon Speedskating
 PDC World Darts Championship – Summaries only (live on the website)
 Red Bull Air Race
 UEFA Champions League, since the 2015/16 season
 FIFA World Cup qualification and UEFA European Championship qualifying matches of the Netherlands national football team (all home and friendly matches)

References

External links
 

1995 establishments in the Netherlands
Television channels in the Netherlands
Television channels and stations established in 1995
Mass media in Amsterdam
Talpa Network